The 2015 Tour of Chongming Island World Cup was a one-day road cycling race, run as part of the ninth Tour of Chongming Island, which included both a multi-stage event and a single-stage event. The single-stage race, which was part of the 2015 UCI Women's Road World Cup, was held on 17 May 2015, in Shanghai, China.

On wide, mostly flat highways, there were no significant breakaways in the first half of the race, until the duo of Liang Hongyu and Anastasia Chulkova established a one-minute lead over the peloton. In a bunch sprint, the Italian rider, Giorgia Bronzini won, beating 2014 winners Kirsten Wild and Fanny Riberot (France national team).

Entry
Ten of the UCI women's teams entered the race, each featuring five or six riders. They were joined by eight national teams containing either four or five riders, bringing the total entry up to 93 riders.

Nations
 France
 Russia
 Hong Kong China
 Taiwan
 Thailand
 South Korea
 China
 Indonesia

Course
The route changed from previous years. The race started at the Shanghai Oriental Sports Center and took place almost entirely on wide, straight highways, with corners predominantly being expansive ninety-degree bends. The course initially followed the Middle Ring Road, the Huaxia Elevated Road and the G1501 Shanghai Ring Expressway, before entering the  tunnel under the Yangtze river to reach Changxing Island, shortly followed by a  bridge to Chongming Island, from where the route followed the course of previous years, along slightly smaller roads to the finish.

Preview
After four rounds of the 2015 UCI Women's Road World Cup, there had been four different winners; Jolien D'Hoore at the Ronde van Drenthe, Lizzie Armitstead at the Trofeo Alfredo Binda-Comune di Cittiglio, Elisa Longo Borghini at the Tour of Flanders, and Anna van der Breggen at the La Flèche Wallonne Féminine. Van der Breggen led the World Cup standings as the racing moved to China for the Tour of Chongming Island, with 290 points, but her  were not invited to take part in the event. Kirsten Wild won both the stage race and the World Cup event in 2014, and repeated her success in the 2015 stage race. She was the pre-race favourite to win the 2015 World Cup race on a course that favoured sprinters.

Race

There were early attacks by two of the Asian teams,  and the Korean national team, but on each occasion they were caught back up by the peloton reasonably quickly. The first intermediate sprint was won by Simona Frapporti, while a subsequent Queen of the Mountain climb was won by Lauren Kitchen. Crossing the Shanghai Yangtze River Bridge, some riders fell off the back of the peloton in the strong crosswinds.

Closing towards the finish in a bunch sprint,  had intended Chloe Hosking to be the sprinter to try and win, but she got caught up behind a crash in the final kilometre, and so Giorgia Bronzini acted as a lead-out for Annette Edmondson. She then found that Edmondson had not been able to follow her, and opted to defend her position and launch a late sprint to pass Wild. Bronzini won, followed by Wild and Fanny Riberot, riding for the France national team. The first 74 riders were all designated the same time.

Results

Race results

World Cup standings

References

Tour of Chongming Island
Tour of Chongming Island
Tour of Chongming Island